Winterpills is the eponymous debut studio album by the Northampton, Massachusetts indie rock band Winterpills, released on November 8, 2005. The album brought the band some critical and fan acclaim, landing in the Top 100 for both iTunes and Amazon.com and a feature on NPR's Weekend Edition.

Track listing

Personnel
Winterpills
Philip Price – vocals, acoustic guitar, keyboards
Flora Reed – vocals
José Ayerve – bass
Dave Hower – drums, percussion
Dennis Crommett – electric guitar, backing vocals

Technical personnel
Henning Ohlenbusch – photography
Ana Price-Eckles – photography
Mastered by Rick Fisher
Mixed by José Ayerve and David Chalfant
Produced by José Ayerve and recorded at Boomerang Ranch, Hadley, Massachusetts, except for "Looking Down", which was produced by David Chalfant and recorded at Sackamusic, Conway, Massachusetts

References

External links
 Winterpills on the Winterpills website 
  Winterpills lyrics

2005 debut albums
Winterpills albums